Blood Wedding (Italian: Nozze di sangue) is a 1941 Italian drama film directed by Goffredo Alessandrini and starring Beatrice Mancini, Fosco Giachetti and Luisa Ferida. It is set in 19th century South America, and features an arranged marriage. The film is based on the novel Immacolata by Lina Pietravalle.

Cast
 Beatrice Mancini as Immacolata  
 Fosco Giachetti as Gidda 
 Luisa Ferida as Nazaria 
 Nino Pavese as Pietro  
 Umberto Spadaro as Maso  
 Adele Garavaglia as Gliceria, la comare  
 Elio Marcuzzo as Angelo 
 Felice Romano as Matteo  
 Fedele Gentile as Raffaele 
 Claudia Marti as Lina 
 Giuseppe Bordonaro as Un boscaiolo 
 Vasco Creti as Il padrone  
 Achille Majeroni as L'affittuario della falegnameria 
 Felice Minotti as Un boscaiolo 
 Katiuscia Odinzova as La danzatrice 
 Emilio Petacci as Lo sposo per procura  
 Mirella Scriatto as La moglie di un boscaiolo

References

External links 

Blood Wedding at Variety Distribution

1941 films
Italian historical drama films
Italian black-and-white films
1940s historical drama films
1940s Italian-language films
Films directed by Goffredo Alessandrini
Films set in the 19th century
Films set in South America
Titanus films
1941 drama films
Films scored by Enzo Masetti
1940s Italian films